Herrick Township is a township in Susquehanna County, Pennsylvania. The population was 711 at the 2020 census.

History
Herrick Township was formed from parts of Gibson and Clifford Townships on April 20, 1825.

Communities
The following villages are located in Herrick Township:
Dimock Corners
Herrick Center (also called Herrick)
Tirzah

Geography

Demographics

2010 census
At the 2010 census there were 713 people, 308 households, and 217 families living in the township.  The population density was 28.9 people per square mile (11.3/km2).  There were 749 housing units at an average density of 30.4/sq mi (11.9/km2).  The racial makeup of the township was 97.3% White, 0.6% African American, 0.3% Native American, 0.3% Asian, 0.7% from some other race, and 0.8% from two or more races. Hispanic or Latino of any race were 1.4%.

Of the 308 households 25% had children under the age of 18 living with them, 58.4% were married couples living together, 5.8% had a female householder with no husband present, and 29.5% were non-families. 25% of households were one person and 8.7% were one person aged 65 or older.  The average household size was 2.31 and the average family size was 2.71.

The age distribution was 18% under the age of 18, 61.7% from 18 to 64, and 20.3% 65 or older. The median age was 49 years. The median household income was $58,125 and the median family income  was $60,069. Males had a median income of $53,500 versus $37,250 for females. The per capita income for the township was $32,337.  About 3% of families and 4.5% of the population were below the poverty line, including 21.1% of those under age 18 and none of those age 65 or over.

Education
Forest City Regional School District is a Preschool-12th grade public school district serving residents of Herrick Township.

References

Populated places established in 1789
Townships in Susquehanna County, Pennsylvania
1789 establishments in Pennsylvania